Sakalakalashala is a 2019 Indian Malayalam-language comedy-drama film directed by Vinod Guruvayoor and starring Niranjan Raju and Manasa Radhakrishnan.

Cast 
Niranjan Raju as Akbar Salam alias Akku
Manasa Radhakrishnan as Mumtaz			
Jacob Gregory as Kannan, Akku's friend	
Dharmajan Bolgatty as Akku's friend
Hareesh Kanaran as Nari
Arun Nadaraj as Faizy
Jenson Alappat		
Grace Antony as Mumtaz's friend	
Saju Navodaya			
Nirmal Palazhi		
Renji Panicker		
Rony Raj as Basil
Shravan Satya as Shravan
Ramesh Thilak	
Shammi Thilakan as Kallarakkal Achan		
Tini Tom as Kolathiparambil Achan
Saniya Iyappan as Swapna (Cameo Appearance)

Production 
The film is set in a college campus. Murali Guinness wrote the film's screenplay.

Soundtrack 
The songs are composed by Aby Tom Cyriac. The song "Pandarakalan Mathai" is based on the song "Panchara Paalu Mittayi" from Bharya (1962).

Release 
The Times of India gave the film a rating of three out of five stars and noted that "The length of the movie, which stands at only about 2 hrs 15 minutes is a big plus, because at no point does the film feel like it is lagging". Deccan Chronicle gave the film two out of five stars and wrote that "The film tries to deal with a very serious and relevant topic, but a strong and well-written script could have been more helpful". Malayalam Samayam gave the film a rating of two-and-a-half out of five stars and praised the screenplay and cinematography.

References

External links 

2010s Malayalam-language films
2019 comedy-drama films
2019 films
Indian comedy-drama films